The Miami Heat are a professional basketball team based in Miami that competes in the National Basketball Association (NBA). The Heat formed in 1988 as an expansion franchise and have since made the playoffs 23 out of 34 seasons, captured 15 division titles, six conference titles, and three NBA championships. Along with the Orlando Magic, they are one of two NBA teams representing the state of Florida. As of the 2021–22 season, they are one of two franchises formed after 1980 to win the NBA title, along with the Toronto Raptors. They defeated the Dallas Mavericks in the 2006 NBA Finals, the Oklahoma City Thunder in the 2012 NBA Finals, and the San Antonio Spurs in the 2013 NBA Finals.

Table key

Seasons

All-time records
Note: Statistics are correct as of May 29, 2022.

Notes

References

 
seasons